David Charles Abbott  was an Irish Anglican priest in the late nineteenth and early twentieth centuries: he was Archdeacon of Clogher from 1906 until 1917.

Finlay was educated at Trinity College, Dublin  and ordained in 1869. He served curacies at Carlingford, Mullaghdun and Sandymount."Clogher clergy and parishes : being an account of the clergy of the Church of Ireland in the Diocese of Clogher, from the earliest period, with historical notices of the several parishes, churches, etc" Leslie, J.B. p49: Enniskille; R. H. Ritchie; 1929 He was the incumbent at Fivemiletown from 1874 until 1886; and Tydavnet from 1886 to 1917.

References

Archdeacons of Clogher
Alumni of Trinity College Dublin
20th-century Irish Anglican priests
19th-century Irish Anglican priests